Two of the Earthly Branches ( 两个时辰 ) is a work
for string quartet, composed by He Xuntian in 1983.

Summary
He Xuntian adopted RD Composition in his work Two of the Earthly Branches.
The work won The 3rd prize of International Carl-Marla-Von-Weber Wettbewerbes Fur Kammermusik 1987 Germany.

References

Compositions by He Xuntian
Chamber music compositions
1983 compositions
Compositions for string quartet